Conor John Joseph Gough (born 9 August 1993 in Ilford, Essex) is an English footballer who plays as a goalkeeper for Coggeshall Town.

Career
Gough started his footballing career with Charlton Athletic signing his first professional contract in 2011 after spending two years as a scholar at the club. During his time as a professional with the London club, he was loaned five times to non-League clubs in order to gain experience. After being told his contract would not be renewed, he signed a two-year deal with Bristol Rovers. Shortly after it was announced that he had joined Rovers, he was loaned to them as Rovers did not have a fit goalkeeper and made his debut in the final game of the 2011–12 season.

Gough signed for Grays Athletic at the start of the 2014–15 season and went on make 39 appearances in the Isthmian League Premier Division and 51 in all competitions. He went on to sign for Concord Rangers in May 2015, and then moved to neighbours Canvey Island in August 2015.

In November 2018, Gough left Canvey Island to sign for Coggeshall Town.

References

External links

1993 births
Living people
English footballers
Association football goalkeepers
Charlton Athletic F.C. players
Lewes F.C. players
St Albans City F.C. players
Salisbury City F.C. players
Eastbourne Borough F.C. players
Chelmsford City F.C. players
Bristol Rovers F.C. players
Grays Athletic F.C. players
Concord Rangers F.C. players
Canvey Island F.C. players
Benfleet F.C. players
Coggeshall Town F.C. players
English Football League players
Isthmian League players